The 2013–14 Primeira Liga (also known as Liga ZON Sagres for sponsorship reasons) was the 80th season of the Primeira Liga, the top professional league for Portuguese association football clubs. It began on 18 August 2013 and concluded on 11 May 2014. Sixteen teams contested the league, fourteen of which took part in the previous season and two of which were promoted from the Segunda Liga. On 20 April 2014, Benfica won the Primeira Liga for a record 33rd time with a 2–0 victory over Olhanense, with two matches to spare.

Teams

Stadia and locations

Personnel and kits

Note: Flags indicate national team as has been defined under FIFA eligibility rules. Players and Managers may hold more than one non-FIFA nationality.

Managerial changes

League table

Positions by round

Results 
Each team will play each other twice, once at home and once away. Giving a total of 30 matches per team to be played.

Relegation play-offs
Paços de Ferreira, who finished 15th, faced Desportivo das Aves, the fourth-placed side of the 2013–14 Segunda Liga (third-placed among non-reserve teams) for a two-legged play-off to decide the 18th team to compete in the expanded 2014–15 Primeira Liga. Paços de Ferreira defeated Desportivo das Aves 3–1 on aggregate to secure their presence in the next Primeira Liga season.

First leg

Second leg

Season statistics

Scoring
 First goal: Paulo Vinícius for Braga against Paços de Ferreira (16 August 2013)
 Largest winning margin: 5 goals
 Paços de Ferreira 0–5 Nacional (19 April 2014)
 Highest scoring game: 7 goals
 Marítimo 3–4 Paços de Ferreira (28 September 2013)
 Most goals scored in a match by a single team: 5 goals
 Sporting 5–1 Arouca (18 August 2013)
 Paços de Ferreira 0–5 Nacional (19 April 2014)
 Most goals scored in a match by a losing team: 3 goals
 Marítimo 3–4 Paços de Ferreira (28 September 2013)

Top goalscorers

Source: LPFP

Hat-tricks

Clean sheets

Player

Club
 Most clean sheets: 17
 Benfica
 Fewest clean sheets: 4
 Paços de Ferreira
 Olhanense

Discipline

Player
Most yellow cards: 13
Nuno Coelho (Arouca)
Most red cards: 2
 Deyverson (Belenenses)

Club
Most yellow cards: 109
Rio Ave
Most red cards: 7
Marítimo
Estoril Praia

Television
This was the first season that Sport TV did not broadcast any Benfica home matches. The club decided not to renew with rightsholders Olivedesportos and instead broadcast their home matches on their own channel, Benfica TV.

RTP Internacional and RTP África broadcast one match per week, via satellite.

Awards

Monthly awards

SJPF Player of the Month

SJPF Young Player of the Month

References

Primeira Liga seasons
Port
1